The Women's Futsal World Tournament is an international women's futsal competition for national teams, organized by national associations and the World Futsal Association. The first edition took place in 2010 in Spain and was won by Brazil. The tournament has known no other winner besides Brazil, after the country's victories in the first six editions.

The tournament is endorsed by national associations such as the Japan Football Association, Iranian Football Federation and FEDEFUT. FIFA runs the men's FIFA Futsal World Cup but not the Women's Futsal World Tournament. The FIFA Women's Futsal World Cup was announced in 2022.

Results

Debut of national teams

Overall team records
In this ranking 3 points are awarded for a win, 1 for a draw and 0 for a loss. As per statistical convention in football, matches decided in extra time are counted as wins and losses, while matches decided by penalty shoot-outs are counted as draws.  Teams are ranked by total points, then by goal difference, then by goals scored.

Medal table

Comprehensive team results by tournament
Legend
 — Champions
 — Runners-up
 — Third place
 — Fourth place
 — Semifinals
5-10 — Fifth to Tenth place
Q — Qualified for upcoming tournament
 — Hosts

References 

 
Women's international futsal competitions
Futsal World Tournament
Futsal, women
Recurring sporting events established in 2010
Recurring sporting events disestablished in 2015